UDIK, the Association for Social Research and Communications (Bosnian: Udruženje za društvena istraživanja i komunikacije/ Удружење за друштвена истраживања и комуникације), is the Bosnian non-governmental organization with offices in Sarajevo and Brčko. It was founded in 2013 by Edvin Kanka Ćudić. Organization aimed to gather facts, documents, and data on genocide, war crimes, and human rights violations in Bosnia and Herzegovina and the former Yugoslavia.

Human rights activities

UDIK was founded in 2013 by 
Edvin Kanka Ćudić. It aimed to gather facts, documents, and data on genocide, war crimes, and human rights violations in Bosnia and Herzegovina and former Yugoslavia. UDIK works across national boundaries to assist post-conflict societies within the region reestablish the rule of law and deal with past human rights abuses. UDIK also implements a victim-oriented transitional justice programme with three principal components:
 Documentation 
 Justice and institutional reform
 Culture of remembrance

UDIK was made up of independent members, intellectuals and professionals from different academic disciplines.

Other activities 
Since its inception, UDIK supports the women's and LGBT rights. Ćudić in several interviews said that the LGBT community, with the Romani people, is the most vulnerable community in Bosnia and Herzegovina. When the Bosnia and Herzegovina’s first LGBT Pride Parade was announced in 2019, UDIK immediately supported the parade.

Activism

Commemorations 

Since 2013, UDIK has organized a large number of commemorations for the victims of past war in the former Yugoslavia (1991-2001). UDIK calls this commemorations the Living monument. The ceremonies were organized in Bosnia and Herzegovina (Sarajevo, Tuzla, Brčko, Zenica, Višegrad, Foča), Croatia (Zagreb, Vukovar) and Serbia (Belgrade, Prijepolje).  Thanks to this initiative, for the first time, many commemorations were organized. These commemorations were related to crimes against civilian victims of Bosniaks, Serbs and Croats.

The activities that got the most attention were the commemoration of the non-Bosniak victims of the crimes committed in Sarajevo's Kazani and commemorations of Serbian victims of the crimes in Operation Storm organized in Sarajevo and Zagreb.

Allegations of bias 
The criticism generally falls into the category of alleged bias, often in response to  UDIK's commemorations to the Yugoslav wars victims. Bias allegations include the organization's insistence on war crimes on Serbs or Croats which were committed by the ARBiH. Bosniak right-wing media in Bosnia think that certain crimes against Serbs or Croats which were committed by the ARBiH were legitimate military targets against the aggressor while UDIK believes that Bosniaks must take responsibility for the killings of civilians in those crimes.

Researches

Publications about war crimes

Every year UDIK publishes documents about war crimes in Bosnia and Herzegovina. UDIK has published extensively on subjects such as war crimes, massacres and human rights violations from 1992 to 1995 in Foča, Višegrad, Sarajevo's Grbavica, Trusina, Sarajevo's Kazani, Sanski Most, Bugojno, Grabovica, Sijekovac, Vlasenica, Zaklopača, Biljani, Čajniče etc. On the 25th anniversary of the Srebrenica genocide, UDIK published a book with the names of the buried victims of genocide from 2003 to 2019.

UDIK's publications about war crimes in Bosnia and Herzegovina are available at the Library of Congress in United States.

Central register of memorials
In December 2015, UDIK team began to research and compile a register of memorials for victims of the Yugoslav wars (1991-2001) including Albanians, Bosniaks, Croats, Montenegrins, Serbs and Others who were killed or disappeared during the armed conflicts in Yugoslavia (1991–2001) with the aim of creating the Central register of memorials on the territory of the former Socialist Federal Republic of Yugoslavia (SFRY) that would serve to curb attempts at historical revisionism and manipulative use of the numbers of victims.

The register is based on analysis of documents from municipalities, cities, museums, tourist organizations, Islamic Community of Bosnia and Herzegovina, Serbian Orthodox Church, ministries of veterans including newspaper reports from the period, internet, publications, associations of veterans and families of the dead, etc.

In 2016, UDIK published the first results of the Central register of memorials for Bosnia and Herzegovina, listing more than 2.100 memorials to the victims of Bosnian War. Next year, UDIK also published register about more than 1.200 memorials built in Croatia dedicated to the victims of Homeland War. In 2018 UDIK published register about more than 300 memorials build in Serbia (without Kosovo) and Montenegro dedicated to the victims of Serbia and Montenegro in Yugoslav wars. The registry also included memorials dedicated to the victims of NATO bombing of Serbia and Montenegro.

The Central register of memorials of the Yugoslav wars is still the only register of memorials to victims of the Yugoslav wars on the territory of the countries of the former Yugoslavia.

Controversial memorials
Since 2017, UDIK has been conducting studies on controversial memorials that were built after 1991 in the countries of the former Yugoslavia, and which glorify 
fascism and hatred among the people of the former Yugoslavia. There are currently publications on controversial monuments in Bosnia and Herzegovina, Croatia, Montenegro and Serbia (without Kosovo). Analysis included monuments dedicated to 
Draža Mihailović, Alojzije Stepinac and Josip Broz Tito.

Advocacy

Campaigns

Since 2014, UDIK has advocated 
the construction of a monument to the victims killed at Sarajevo's Kazani. UDIK started this campaign as the first non-governmental organization which commemorated victims of this war crime. Commemorations were organised in front of the Sarajevo's Cathedral. Since 2017, UDIK has been demanding that the City of Sarajevo build a monument to the victims of this crime in the Kazani and in the center of Sarajevo. This is justified by the fact that Kazani is far from the Sarajevo, and that  citizens need monument in the city for dealing with the past. In 2020, this UDIK's initiative was accepted by other Bosnian and international organizations. A year later, same initiative was also accepted by intellectuals and representatives of the victims of this war crime. However, the initiative was rejected by the mayor of Sarajevo, Benjamina Karić. That is why the City Council started the construction of the monument in location of Kazani, without consultations for the initiators and victims. In September 2021 City Council of Sarajevo made a monument proposal. On that proposal UDIK requested that name of perpetrator of the war crimes be written on the monument, and that the number of the mentioned victims on the monument is not final. The mayor refusef that request.

Kazani monument was opened in November 2021 by the Benjamina Karić. None of the victims' representatives was present at the opening of the monument. That is why Edvin Kanka Ćudić stated for Oslobođenje: "The government made a monument to itself at Kazani".

In April 2022, United States Ambassador to Bosnia and Herzegovina Michael J. Murphy supported UDIK's idea about monument at Kazani.

Cooperations

Since 2013, UDIK has been a member of the RECOM Reconciliation Network. The RECOM Reconciliation Network is a network of civil society organizations from post-Yugoslav countries which advocate for the establishment of RECOM – the Regional Commission tasked with establishing the facts about all Victims of war Crimes and other serious human rights violations committed on the territory of the former Yugoslavia from 1 January 1991 to 31 December 2001.

Since 2014, UDIK has been cooperating with organizations from Croatia and Serbia in the campaign "The crimes in the Operation Storm are the responsibility of all of us" in commemorate Serbian victims  of the crimes in Operation Storm in Croatia. In May 2015, Federal Ministry of Interior of the Bosnia and Herzegovina banned the Sarajevo's commemoration of Serbian victims of the crimes committed in Operation Storm. In May 2016 the same commemoration was banned by Ministry of the Interior of the Republic of Croatia, but in the end it was held in Zagreb with high police security.

In 2015, UDIK co-operated with the ICMP on the occasion of marking the International Day of the Disappeared, a commemoration designed to raise public awareness about the issue of missing persons from armed conflict and human rights abuses.

In 2017, UDIK co-operated with the Sarajevo Film Festival in the Dealing with the Past program at the True Stories Market.

In 2020, UDIK co-operated with the SENSE Transitional Justice Center and civil society organizations from Bosnia and Herzegovina, Croatia, Kosovo and Serbia in the campaign "Srebrenica 25: Together against the denial virus" to commemorate the 25th anniversary of the Srebrenica genocide.

In 2021, UDIK co-operated with the SENSE Transitional Justice Center and civil society organizations from Bosnia and Herzegovina, Croatia, Montenegro and Serbia in the campaign "Dubrovnik 1991: Targeting Monuments" to commemorate the 30th anniversary of the shelling of Old City of Dubrovnik.

Bibliography

Publications published by UDIK:

In Bosnian, Croatian and Serbian
 Ratni zločini u Brčkom ('92-'95): presude (Sarajevo, 2016)
 In memoriam Centar Sarajevo (1992-1995) (Sarajevo, 2016)
 Ratni zločin na Kazanima: presude (Sarajevo, 2016, 2020)
 In memoriam Bosna i Hercegovina (1992-1995), vol. 1 (Sarajevo, 2016)
 Ratni zločin u Trusini: presude (Sarajevo, 2017)
 Ratni zločini u Višegradu: presude (Sarajevo, 2017)
 Ratni zločini u Foči: presude (Sarajevo, 2017)
 In memoriam Republika Hrvatska (1991-1995), vol. 1 (Brčko-Sarajevo, 2017)
 Građanska memorijalizacija u Bosni i Hercegovini i Republici Hrvatskoj (Sarajevo, 2017)
 Od Jugoslavije do Dejtona - Spomenici i kultura sjećanja kroz uticaj društveno-političkih sistema: Priručnik za predavače historije/istorije/povijesti (Sarajevo, 2017)
 Ratni zločini na Grbavici: presude (Sarajevo, 2017)
 Ratni zločini u Sanskom Mostu: presude (Sarajevo, 2017)
 In memoriam Crna Gora i Republika Srbija, vol. 1 (Brčko-Sarajevo, 2018)
 Spomenici i politike sjećanja u Bosni i Hercegovini i Republici Hrvatskoj: kontroverze (Sarajevo, 2018)
 Putevima sjećanja: fotografski prikazi memorijalizacije u Bosni i Hercegovini (Sarajevo, 2019)
 Ratni zločin u Grabovici: presude (Sarajevo, 2019)
 Ratni zločin u Sijekovcu, predmet: Zemir Kovačević (Sarajevo, 2019)
 Ratni zločini u Milićima i Vlasenici: presude (Sarajevo, 2019)
 Nestali, sjećanja i mediji u postdejtonskoj Bosni i Hercegovini i regionu (Sarajevo, 2020)
 Ratni zločin u Biljanima, predmet: Marko Samardžija (Sarajevo, 2020)
 Izvještaj Vlade Republike Srpske o događajima u i oko Srebrenice od 10. do 19. jula 1995. (Sarajevo, 2020)
 Srebrenica: 25 godina sjećanje na žrtve genocida (Sarajevo, 2020)
 Ratni zločini u Čajniču: presude (Sarajevo, 2020)
 Sarajevo: sjećanje na žrtve holokausta (Sarajevo, 2021)
 Ratni zločini u Bugojnu: presude (Sarajevo, 2021)
 Kultura sjećanja i strategije reprezentacije ratne prošlosti devedesetih u Bosni i Hercegovini, Hrvatskoj i Srbiji (Sarajevo, 2022)
 Ratni zločini u Bugojnu, predmet: Nisvet Gasal i drugi, vol. 1 (Sarajevo, 2022)
 Ratni zločini u Bugojnu, predmet: Nisvet Gasal i drugi, vol. 2 (Sarajevo, 2022)
 Spomenici i politike sjećanja u Srbiji i Crnoj Gori: kontroverze (Sarajevo, 2022)
 Selektivna memorijalizacija u Bosni i Hercegovini: pokušaji etnonacionalističkih politika da prekrajaju historiju i diktiraju politiku sjećanja i identiteta kroz spomenike i memorijalne komplekse (Sarajevo, 2023) − Dino Jozić

Translations into English
 In Memoriam Bosnia and Herzegovina (1992-1995), vol. 1 (Sarajevo, 2016)
 In Memoriam Republic of Croatia (1991-1995), vol. 1 (Brčko-Sarajevo, 2017)
 In Memoriam Montenegro and Republic of Serbia, vol. 1 (Brčko-Sarajevo, 2018)
 Monuments and the politics of memory in Bosnia and Herzegovina and Croatia: controversies (Sarajevo, 2018)
 Selective Memorialization in Bosnia and Herzegovina: Attempts of ethno-nationalist policies to rewrite history and dictate the politics of memory and identity through monuments and memorials'' (Sarajevo, 2023) − Dino Jozić

References

External links
 
  Organisation Data TACSO
  Organisation Data Insight on Conflict
  Organisation Data Ana Lindh Foundation
  Organisation Data Transconflict

Human rights organizations based in Bosnia and Herzegovina
Organizations established in 2013
Transitional justice
Yugoslav Wars